Alain Claeys (born 25 August 1948) is a French politician. He is a member of the Socialist Party, former Mayor of Poitiers (2008-2020) and a former member of the National Assembly of France for the first constituency of the Vienne department (1997-2017).  He sits in the Socialist, Radical, Citizen and Miscellaneous Left group in the National Assembly.

In 2013, as Mayor of Poitiers, he decides the sale of the Poitiers Theater and the destruction of this hall designed by the French architect Édouard Lardillier and built  in 1954, in order to realize a commercial gallery and some flats, through a controversial real estate business.

He graduated from the University of Poitiers.

References

1948 births
Living people
University of Poitiers alumni
Socialist Party (France) politicians
Deputies of the 12th National Assembly of the French Fifth Republic
Deputies of the 13th National Assembly of the French Fifth Republic
Deputies of the 14th National Assembly of the French Fifth Republic